Easy Money was a board game introduced by Milton Bradley Company in 1935. Like Monopoly, the game is based on The Landlord's Game in the movement of pieces around the board, the use of cards, properties that can be purchased, and houses that can be established on them.

Game play
Easy Money is a member of the Landlord's Game/auction family of games, of which Monopoly is the most famous example. Players begin with a set amount of money. Properties allow owners to charge rents based on the houses purchased on that property. Players may trade or sell properties. Other spaces have a particular action that must be taken when landing on or passing over.

Key differences from Monopoly include:
 no "color groups" for properties (instead, a player must own one "street" on each of the four sides of the board before properties can be improved)
 no listed purchase prices for utilities or commercial buildings, instead they are automatically auctioned off by the bank to the highest bidder once a player lands on one of these unowned properties
 no Title Deed cards with printed rents and mortgage values (instead, the information is printed on the gameboard)
 instead of a shared pool of houses and hotels, each player has color-coded houses that are used to denote ownership of a property as well as the current rent value
 no dedicated "Jail" space
 no "Free Parking" space nor the optional "Free Parking jackpot house rule". Instead money collected from "accident" spaces officially goes to the "Hospital" space. When a player lands on Hospital, they may take that money.
 a "red traffic light" space (or spaces depending on the version), in which players pay a traffic fine for passing over instead of landing on those spaces.
 rather than the two card types in Parker Brothers' Monopoly (and early Finance sets) players draw "Give-or-Take" cards whenever they throw doubles on the dice, with similar rewards and penalties. Since there is no "Jail" space and thus no Get Out of Jail Free card, there is instead a special exception card for taxes and traffic fines.

Players start with $2,000 (rather than $1,500 as they do in Monopoly), and earn $250 (not $200) for completing a full circuit of the board. In the 1974 edition of the game, basic dollar amounts were multiplied by 10; consequently, these figures became $20,000 to start with and $2,500 for a full circuit, with commensurate increases in property values and rents.

A game of Easy Money ends when one player is not able to pay what they owe, and had sold or mortgaged all of their properties. At that point (if more than two are playing), the cash-on-hand of each remaining player, plus the value of each property owned (and not mortgaged), is used to determine each player's net worth; the player with the highest total is determined the winner. (One major flaw in Easy Money is that a player collects more by mortgaging than was paid when purchasing the property.)

Games can last several hours, but games with three or more players are generally shorter than a typical Monopoly session with the same number of players (as it is not a requirement for one player to force all of their opponents into bankruptcy).

History
Milton Bradley Company (MB) was one of the companies that Charles Darrow showed his Monopoly in 1934, but was turned down. After the success of Monopoly and Finance, Milton Bradley decided to issue its own version of Finance.  Despite the Landlord's Game patents having expired and the auction-monopoly game itself having developed in the public domain, Parker Brothers sued Milton Bradley for patent infringement, and the latter was forced to license the former's patents to continue production of the game. MB was forced by Parker Brothers to make changes for its 1936 "New Improved Edition" issued in three separate versions, so that it no longer played quite so similarly to Monopoly. A design patent for Easy Money was applied for at the Patent Office and was either withdrawn or rejected.

A new board was made for the 1940s edition with a new box design in the 1950s. A final Milton Bradley edition was printed in 1974; in this version all dollar amounts had been multiplied by ten, and the board had been further redesigned to look even less Monopoly-like. In 2005 under license from Hasbro, Winning Moves republished the 1950s version with new property names.

Board

*  non-property spaces

Changes
From 1935 to 1936 editions:
Give or Take space removed - Instead, if a double (e.g. 5 and 5) was thrown, the player took a "give-or-take" card.
deeds removed with the colored houses representing ownership & property information directly on the board

Another Easy Money
In 1989, Milton Bradley published another game called Easy Money that was completely unrelated in look or gameplay to the original. In this game, players move around a board and are given the chance to speculate on Wall Street, gamble in Las Vegas, and play in lotteries. Reviewer Alan Kennedy Rated this version a "turkey" (0 out of 5), commenting that "it requires no skill, strategy or tactics: in fact no thought at all. You roll the dice, move, follow instructions for the square, the next person rolls the dice, moves ad infinitum."

References

External links

Ea$y Money - 1988 version of the game

Board games introduced in 1935
Milton Bradley Company games
Economic simulation board games
Roll-and-move board games
Winning Moves games